Ranbir was a daily Urdu language newspaper published from Jammu, India. It was the first daily newspaper in Jammu and Kashmir.

Founding
Ranbir was founded and edited by Lala Mulkraj Saraf. He had previously worked as sub-editor of Lala Lajpat Rai's nationalist organ Bande Mataram. Saraf had negotiated for some time to obtain the permission from the Maharaja Pratap Singh of Jammu and Kashmir to publish Ranbir as a statewide weekly.

The newspaper was named after Maharaja Ranbir Singh. The first issue of Ranbir was published on 24 June 1924. Ranbir would become the first daily newspaper in Jammu and Kashmir. The newspaper was printed at the Government Press. Instantly after its foundation, the paper gained a wide readership in the state.

1930 ban
In May 1930 Maharaja Hari Singh issued a ban on Ranbir (accusing it of 'subversive propaganda'), following an article about an agitation in Jammu related to the arrest of Mahatma Gandhi in British India. The Maharaja argued that Ranbir had, in its 7 May 1930 (Baisakh 25, 1987) issue exaggerated the participation figures in the Jammu protest and that the newspaper had false alluded that the Maharaja himself would have supported the protests. The newspaper was allowed to resume publication in November 1931. This period was marked by increased pressure towards responsible government in Jammu and Kashmir, a movement that Ranbir supported.

1947 ban and later years
The newspaper was banned in June 1947, following having demanded accession to India and urged for the release of Sheikh Abdullah. The ban was eventually lifted and Ranbir re-appeared in September 1947. In the following years Ranbir was an important mouthpiece of the anti-Pakistani tendency in Jammu and Kashmir. Ranbir was finally closed down on 18 May 1950.

References

1924 establishments in India
1950 disestablishments in India
Urdu-language newspapers published in India
Daily newspapers published in India
Banned newspapers